The Maiden Lane Historic District is a national historic district located at Raleigh, North Carolina. The district encompasses 12 contributing residential buildings and was developed between about 1893 and 1923. The district includes notable examples of Queen Anne and Colonial Revival style architecture. Notable houses include the Isabella Morrison Hill House (c. 1895), Irby-Brewer House (c. 1893), Allie H. Kirks House (c. 1914), Love Virginia Davis House (c. 1905), and Frank Brown House (1923).

In 2006, the district was listed on the National Register of Historic Places.

See also
 List of Registered Historic Places in North Carolina

References

External links
 National Register Historic Districts in Raleigh, North Carolina, RHDC
 National Register of Historic Places Nomination Form, North Carolina SHPO

Houses on the National Register of Historic Places in North Carolina
Historic districts on the National Register of Historic Places in North Carolina
Neighborhoods in Raleigh, North Carolina
Queen Anne architecture in North Carolina
Colonial Revival architecture in North Carolina
National Register of Historic Places in Raleigh, North Carolina
Houses in Raleigh, North Carolina